Hey! Say! JUMP-ing Tour '08-'09 is the second DVD live concert released by Hey! Say! JUMP under the J Storm label. The DVD covers the last performance of the group in Yokohama Arena. The DVD was certified Gold  by RIAJ.

Information
The concert tour began from the end of 2008 till the early year of 2009. The concert toured a total of three cities in Japan. Osaka, Nagoya, and Yokohama, where the concert DVD was shot last January 5, 2009 and attracts 140,000 people. The concert covers a full show that showcases the number one singles of the group over the past year. The DVD features a total of 28 stage performances.

Songs
"Overture"
"Ultra Music Power"
"Dreams Come True"
"Your Seed"
"FLY"

"Moonlight"

"Star Time"
Honey Beat

"Switch"

"Hey! Say!"
"Memories"

"Ultra Music Power"
"Dreams Come True"

Release

References

External links
"Hey! Say! JUMP-ing Tour '08-'09" product information 

Hey! Say! JUMP albums
2009 video albums
Live video albums
2009 live albums
Albums recorded at the Yokohama Arena